The New Sivas 4 Eylül Stadium is a stadium in Sivas, Turkey. It opened in 2016 and is the new home of Sivasspor of the Süper Lig. The stadium has a capacity of 27,532 spectators, and replaced the club's previous home, 4 Eylül Stadium. The new stadium is also known as 4 Eylül Stadium.

References

Football venues in Turkey
Sport in Sivas
Sports venues completed in 2016
2016 establishments in Turkey